Verdugo may refer to:

 Verdugo (river), a river in Pontevedra, Galicia, Spain
 Verdugo (surname)
 Verdugo Mountains, a mountain range in California, United States
 Verdugo Park, a park in California, United States
 Verdugo Recreation Center, a recreation center in California, United States
 Verdugo Wash, a river in California, United States

See also
 El Verdugo (disambiguation)
 Verdugo Hills (disambiguation)
 Verdugos, a region of Los Angeles County, California